June is a gender-neutral given name. It is a common female name and a less common male name in English-speaking countries. It comes from the name of the month, which is derived from Juno, the name of a Roman goddess. It is also a short form of the names Juniper, Junia, Junius and Junior.

June is also an unrelated Basque feminine name meaning “place of the reeds”.

June was a very popular girl's name and somewhat popular boy's name in the early to mid 20th century in the United States. As a girl's name, it reached a peak in 1925 as the 39th most popular name, but then gradually declined until it dropped off the top 1000 list of names in 1987. In recent years, it has started to make a comeback: in 2018 it ranked 241st.

As a boy's name, June reached a peak in 1922 at 697th, but then also declined and left the top 1000 list in 1939.

People named June include

People in the arts
June Allyson (1917–2006), American film and television actress, popular in the 1940s and 1950s
June Anderson (born 1952), American coloratura soprano
June Black (1910–2009), New Zealand ceramic artist and painter
June Blair (1933-2022), American model and actress best known for being Playboy magazine's Playmate of the Month in January 1957
June Bland (born 1931), British actress best known for her guest appearances in two Doctor Who serials
June Brigman (born 1960), American comic book artist and illustrator
June Bronhill (1929–2005), soprano opera singer
June Brown (1927–2022), English actress and author
June Caprice (1895–1936), American silent film actress
June Carter Cash (1929–2003), American singer, songwriter, actress, member of the Carter Family, wife of Johnny Cash
June Chadwick (born 1951), English actress
June Christy (1925–1990), American jazz singer popular in the 1950s
June Cochran (1942–2004), American model and beauty queen
June Collyer (1906–1968), American actress
June Duprez (1918–1984), British film actress
June Foray (1917–2017), American voice actress who has worked for most of the studios which produced animated films since the 1940s
June Furlong (1930–2020), English model
June Harding (1937–2019), child and teen actress
June Harrison (1925–1974), American film actress
June Haver (1926–2005), American film actress
June Havoc (1912–2010), American actress, dancer, writer and theater director
June Hutton (1920–1973), American popular singer
June James (producer) (born 1990), American music producer
June Jordan (1936–2002), African-American bisexual political activist, writer, poet and teacher
June Lang (1915–2005), American film actress
June Lockhart (born 1925), American actress
June Loney (1930–2016), Australian harpist
June MacCloy (1909–2005), American actress in the 1930s and 1940s
June Marlowe (1903–1984), American actress
June Mathis (1892–1927), screenwriter and Hollywood executive in the 1920s
June Melville (1915–1970), English actress and theatre manager 
June Millington (born 1948), in 1969 founded Fanny, the first all girl rock band signed to a major record label
June Page, British actress
June Palmer (1940–2004), aka June Power, model 
June Pointer (1953–2006), American singer, founding member of The Pointer Sisters
June Salter (1932–2001), Australian actress
June Sarpong (born 1977), British television presenter
June Spencer (born 1919), English actress and voice artist
June Tabor (born 1947), English folk singer
June Taylor (1918–2004), American choreographer
June Tripp (1901–1985), sometimes known just as June, British actress
June Tyson (1936–1992), jazz singer
June Vincent (1920–2008), actress
June Walker (1900–1966), American stage and film actress
June Whitfield (1925–2018), English actress

Others
June Atkinson (born 1948), the North Carolina Superintendent of Public Instruction
June Bacon-Bercey (1928–2019), American meteorologist
June Callwood (1924–2007), Canadian journalist and social activist
June Clark (nurse) (born 1941), Professor of Community Nursing at the University of Wales, Swansea
June Croft (born 1963), British freestyle swimmer
June Dally-Watkins (born 1927), Australian businesswoman, fashion-model and etiquette and deportment expert
June Downey (1875–1932), American psychologist
June Mar Fajardo (born 1989), Filipino basketball player
June Ferguson (1928–2004), Australian sprinter and coach
June Fletcher, writer for The Wall Street Journal
June Gibbons, (born 1963) one of two identical twins whose story is a curious case involving psychology and language
June Haimoff (1922–2022), English environmentalist
June Jackson (1939–2019), New Zealand Māori activist and public servant
June James (American football) (1962–1990), American football linebacker
June James (cricketer) (1925–1997), Australian cricket player
June Jones (born 1953), American football player and coach
June Leow (born 1964), Malaysian politician
June Lloyd, Baroness Lloyd of Highbury (1928–2006), British paediatrician and, in retirement, a cross bench member of the House of Lords
June Maston (1928–2004), retired Australian sprinter
June McCarroll (1867–1954), a nurse (later a physician) who is credited with the idea of painting lines on highways to separate lanes
June Miller (1902–1979), the second wife of Henry Miller
June Mummery (born 1963/1964), British businesswoman and politician
June Peppas (1929–2016), a professional baseball player for the AAGPBL from 1948 to 1954
June Rowlands (1924–2017), 60th mayor of Toronto, Ontario, and the first woman to hold that office
June C. Smith (1875–1947), American jurist, Chief Justice of the Illinois Supreme Court
June Westbury (1921–2004), Canadian politician

Fictional characters
 June Cleaver, in the 1950s television series Leave It to Beaver
 June Motomiya (Jun Motomiya), in Digimon Zero Two
 June Slater, in the US soap opera Loving
 Chameleon June, in the Japanese manga series Saint Seiya
 June Iparis, a main character in the novel Legend
 June, short for Juniper, in the animated television series The Life and Times of Juniper Lee
 June, from the show KaBlam!
 June Spume, a character from the British-Canadian program Planet Sketch
 June, in the Nickelodeon animated television series Avatar: The Last Airbender
 June, one of the main characters in the animated preschool television series Little Einsteins
 June, from the anime and manga series Hamtaro
 The female main character on That '80s Show, whose first name "June" is mentioned in only one episode
 June Osborne, in the US television series The Handmaid's Tale

See also 
 June (Basque given name)

References

English feminine given names
English unisex given names
Latin feminine given names
Juno (mythology)